Vicksburg is a ghost town in Bay County, Florida, United States, located near the intersection of State Road 77 and County Road 388.

Geography
Vicksburg is located at 30°20'N 85°40'W (30.3256,-85.6647).

External links
 Vicksburg - Ghost Town at Ghost Towns and History of the American West

Ghost towns in Florida
Former populated places in Bay County, Florida